Locke is an unincorporated community in Locke Township, Elkhart County, Indiana.

History
Locke was laid out in 1867. It took its name from Locke Township.

Geography

References

Unincorporated communities in Elkhart County, Indiana
Unincorporated communities in Indiana